The 2021–22 CAA men's basketball season is the 36th season of Colonial Athletic Association basketball, taking place between November 2021 and March 2022.  Practices began in October 2021, and the season ended with the 2022 CAA men's basketball tournament.

This is the final CAA season for James Madison, which joins the Sun Belt Conference on July 1, 2022.

Head coaches

Coaching changes 
Pat Kelsey replaced Earl Grant as Charleston head coach.
Speedy Claxton replaced Joe Mihalich as Hofstra head coach.

Coaches 

Notes:
 All records, appearances, titles, etc. are from time with current school only.
 Year at school includes 2021–22 season.
 Overall and CAA records are from time at current school and are through the end of the 2020–21 season.

Preseason

Preseason poll 

Source

() first place votes

Preseason All-Conference Teams 
Source

Colonial Athletic Association Preseason Player of the Year: Camren Wynter (Drexel)

Regular season

Rankings

Conference matrix 
This table summarizes the head-to-head results between teams in conference play.

Postseason

Colonial Athletic Association tournament

NCAA tournament 

The CAA had one bid to the 2022 NCAA Division I men's basketball tournament, that being the automatic bid of Delaware by winning the conference tournament.

National Invitation tournament 

Towson received an automatic bid to the 2022 National Invitation Tournament as regular season conference champions.

College Basketball Invitational 

UNC Wilmington was invited to play in the 2022 College Basketball Invitational.

The Basketball Classic

Awards and honors

Regular season

CAA Player of the Week

 Nov. 15 – Zach Cooks (Hofstra)
 Nov. 22 – Ryan Allen (Delaware)
 Nov. 29 – Cam Holden (Towson)
 Dec. 6  – Aaron Estrada (Hofstra)
 Dec. 13 – Jason Gibson (Towson)
 Dec. 20 – Aaron Estrada (Hofstra)(2)
 Dec. 27 – Nicolas Timberlake (Towson)
 Jan. 3  – Darius Burford (Elon)
 Jan. 10 – Aaron Estrada (Hofstra)(3)
 Jan. 17 – Charles Falden (James Madison)
 Jan. 24 – Dylan Painter (Delaware), Shykeim Phillips (UNCW)
 Jan. 31 – Charles Thompson (Towson)
 Feb. 7  – Aaron Estrada (Hofstra)(4)
 Feb. 14 – Aaron Estrada (Hofstra)(5)
 Feb. 21 – Jaylen Sims (UNCW)
 Feb. 28 – Dimitrius Underwood (Charleston), Amari Williams (Drexel)

CAA Rookie of the Week

 Nov. 15 – Reyne Smith (Charleston)
 Nov. 22 – Reyne Smith (Charleston)(2)
 Nov. 29 – Reyne Smith (Charleston)(3)
 Dec. 6  – Reyne Smith (Charleston)(4)
 Dec. 13 – Ben Burnham (Charleston)
 Dec. 20 – Trazarien White (UNCW)
 Dec. 27 – Ben Burnham (Charleston)(2)
 Jan. 3  – Julian Lewis (William & Mary)
 Jan. 10 – Ben Burnham (Charleston)(3)
 Jan. 17 – Langdon Hatton (William & Mary)
 Jan. 24 – Reyne Smith (Charleston)(5)
 Jan. 31 – Jyare Davis (Delaware)
 Feb. 7  – Jyare Davis (Delaware)(2)
 Feb. 14 – Jyare Davis (Delaware)(3)
 Feb. 21 – Jyare Davis (Delaware)(4)
 Feb. 28 – Jyare Davis (Delaware)(5)

Postseason

CAA All-Conference Teams and Awards

Attendance

References